Peyton Elizabeth Lee (born May 22, 2004) is an American actress. She is known for playing the title role on the Disney Channel comedy-drama series Andi Mack and the title character of Doogie Kameāloha, M.D. on Disney+.

Career
Prior to Andi Mack, Lee recurred in 3 episodes of Shameless as a "girl soldier" and appeared on Scandal as "Violet", a spelling bee champion.

Andi Mack premiered on Disney Channel on April 7, 2017. When asked about casting Lee in the lead role, Andi Mack executive producer Terri Minsky said she "liked that Lee did not look as if she had fallen off a child-star assembly line", later stating that "What's really great about Peyton is that she can easily handle both the drama and the comedy of this character." On January 9, 2018, it was announced that Lee is joining the Disney Junior animated series The Lion Guard as Rani, appearing in seven to nine episodes from the third season.

On January 14, 2021, it was announced that Lee would play the titular role in Doogie Kameāloha, M.D., a reboot of Doogie Howser, M.D. that airs on Disney+.

Personal life
Born in New York City, she moved to Manhattan Beach, California, and began acting at the age of 10.

Lee is half Chinese on her father's side; her father is actor Andrew Tinpo Lee, whom she describes as "one of the major reasons why I have become an actor." Her mother, Jennifer Dormer Lee, is a psychologist. She has an older sister and a younger brother.

Filmography

Awards and nominations

References

External links

 
 

2004 births
21st-century American actresses
Actresses from Los Angeles
Actresses from New York City
American actresses of Chinese descent
American child actresses
American television actresses
American voice actresses
Living people